Stephen Fennelly (1816 – 1880)  was an Irish born Roman Catholic Bishop of Madras in India from 1868 until 1880. Fennelly was from Moyne, County Tipperary,,  he succeeded his brother John Fennelly who had served as Bishop of Madras from 1841 until his death 1868.  He served as Vicar General for the Diocese of Madras, he also gained the religious title of Monsignor. He brought the Irish Patrician Brothers to India in 1875.

References

1816 births
1880 deaths
Alumni of St Patrick's College, Maynooth
Irish expatriate Catholic bishops